The Max Aicher Arena (in the past also known as Eisstadion Inzell and Ludwig-Schwabl-Stadion) is a stadium located in Inzell, Germany, best known as a speed skating venue. It is an indoor, artificial ice rink, located 690 metres (2,264 feet) above sea level and has a capacity of 10,000 people. Since its opening, as an outdoor venue, towards the end of 1965, more than 80 world records in speed skating have been broken here, and until the advent of indoor speed skating arenas, it was known as the fastest European speed skating rink, second in the world after the Medeu rink.

The stadium is also used for ice hockey, ice speedway, and (in the summer months) roller skating.

Competitions 
 2011 Ice Racing World Championship Final 4
 2011 World Single Distance Speed Skating Championships
 2019 World Single Distance Speed Skating Championships

Track records

External links

 Official site (in German)

Speed skating venues in Germany
Speedway venues in Germany
Traunstein (district)
Sports venues in Bavaria
Indoor speed skating venues